In the 1760s, Johann Heinrich Lambert was the first to prove that the number  is irrational, meaning it cannot be expressed as a fraction , where  and  are both integers. In the 19th century, Charles Hermite found a proof that requires no prerequisite knowledge beyond basic calculus. Three simplifications of Hermite's proof are due to Mary Cartwright, Ivan Niven, and Nicolas Bourbaki. Another proof, which is a simplification of Lambert's proof, is due to Miklós Laczkovich. Many of these are proofs by contradiction.

In 1882, Ferdinand von Lindemann proved that  is not just irrational, but transcendental as well.

Lambert's proof

In 1761, Lambert proved that  is irrational by first showing that this continued fraction expansion holds:

Then Lambert proved that if x is non-zero and rational, then this expression must be irrational. Since tan(/4) = 1, it follows that /4 is irrational, and thus  is also irrational. A simplification of Lambert's proof is given below.

Hermite's proof 
As in many proofs of irrationality, it is a proof by contradiction.

Consider the sequences of functions An and Un from  into  for  defined by:

 

Using induction we can prove that

and therefore we have:

So

which is equivalent to

Using the definition of the sequence and employing induction we can show that 

where Pn and Qn are polynomial functions with integer coefficients and the degree of Pn is smaller than or equal to ⌊n/2⌋. In particular, An(/2) = Pn(2/4).

Hermite also gave a closed expression for the function An, namely

He did not justify this assertion, but it can be proved easily. First of all, this assertion is equivalent to

Proceeding by induction, take n = 0.

and, for the inductive step, consider any . If

then, using integration by parts and Leibniz's rule, one gets

But this number is clearly greater than 0. On the other hand, the limit of this quantity as n goes to infinity is zero, and so, if n is large enough, N < 1. Thereby, a contradiction is reached.

He discussed the recurrence relations to motivate and to obtain a convenient integral representation. Once this integral representation is obtained, there are various ways to present a succinct and self-contained proof starting from the integral (as in Cartwright's, Bourbaki's or Niven's presentations), which Hermite could easily see (as he did in his proof of the transcendence of e).

Moreover, Hermite's proof is closer to Lambert's proof than it seems. In fact, An(x) is the "residue" (or "remainder") of Lambert's continued fraction for tan(x).

Cartwright's proof 

Harold Jeffreys wrote that this proof was set as an example in an exam at Cambridge University in 1945 by Mary Cartwright, but that she had not traced its origin. It still remains on the 4th problem sheet today for the Analysis IA course at Cambridge University.

Consider the integrals

where n is a non-negative integer.

Two integrations by parts give the recurrence relation

If

then this becomes

Furthermore, J0(x) = 2sin(x) and J1(x) = −4x cos(x) + 4sin(x). Hence for all n ∈ Z+,

where Pn(x) and Qn(x) are polynomials of degree ≤ n, and with integer coefficients (depending on n).

Take x = /2, and suppose if possible that /2 = a/b, where a and b are natural numbers (i.e., assume that  is rational). Then

 

The right side is an integer. But 0 < In(/2) < 2 since the interval [−1, 1] has length 2 and the function that is being integrated takes only values between 0 and 1. On the other hand,

 

Hence, for sufficiently large n

 

that is, we could find an integer between 0 and 1. That is the contradiction that follows from the assumption that  is rational.

This proof is similar to Hermite's proof. Indeed,

However, it is clearly simpler. This is achieved by omitting the inductive definition of the functions An and taking as a starting point their expression as an integral.

Niven's proof 

Given any positive integer n, we define the polynomial function:

and, for each x ∈ ℝ let

Claim 1:  is an integer.

Proof:
Expanding f as a sum of monomials, the coefficient of xk is a number of the form  where ck is an integer, which is 0 if . Therefore,  is 0 when  and it is equal to  if ; in each case,  is an integer and therefore F(0) is an integer.

On the other hand,  = f(x) and so  =  for each non-negative integer k. In particular,  =  Therefore,  is also an integer and so F() is an integer (in fact, it is easy to see that F() = F(0), but that is not relevant to the proof). Since F(0) and F() are integers, so is their sum.

Claim 2:

Proof: Since  is the zero polynomial, we have

The derivatives of the sine and cosine function are given by sin' = cos and cos' = −sin. Hence the product rule implies

By the fundamental theorem of calculus

 

which is smaller than 1 for large n, hence  for these n, by Claim 2. This is impossible for the positive integer . This  shows that the original assumption that π is rational leads to a contradiction, which concludes the proof.

The above proof is a polished version, which is kept as simple as possible concerning the prerequisites, of an analysis of the formula

which is obtained by  integrations by parts. Claim 2 essentially establishes this formula, where the use of F hides the iterated integration by parts. The last integral vanishes because  is the zero polynomial. Claim 1 shows that the remaining sum is an integer.

Niven's proof is closer to Cartwright's (and therefore Hermite's) proof than it appears at first sight. In fact,

Therefore, the substitution xz = y turns this integral into 

In particular,

Another connection between the proofs lies in the fact that Hermite already mentions that if f is a polynomial function and

then

from which it follows that

Bourbaki's proof 
Bourbaki's proof is outlined as an exercise in his calculus treatise. For each natural number b and each non-negative integer n, define

Besides, for each natural number b, An(b) < 1 if n is large enough, because

 

and therefore

On the other hand, repeated integration by parts allows us to deduce that, if a and b are natural numbers such that  = a/b and f is the polynomial function from [0,] into R defined by

 

then:

This last integral is 0, since f (2n + 1) is the null function (because f is a polynomial function of degree 2n). Since it is also greater than 0, it must be a natural number. But it was also proved that An(b) < 1 if n is large enough, thereby reaching a contradiction.

This proof is quite close to Niven's proof, the main difference between them being the way of proving that the numbers An(b) are integers.

Laczkovich's proof 
Miklós Laczkovich's proof is a simplification of Lambert's original proof. He considers the functions

These functions are clearly defined for all x ∈ R. Besides

Claim 1: The following recurrence relation holds:

Proof: This can be proved by comparing the coefficients of the powers of x.

Claim 2: For each x ∈ R, 

Proof: In fact, the sequence x2n/n! is bounded (since it converges to 0) and if C is an upper bound and if k > 1, then

Claim 3: If x ≠ 0 and if x2 is rational, then

Proof: Otherwise, there would be a number y ≠ 0 and integers a and b such that fk(x) = ay and fk + 1(x) = by. In order to see why, take y = fk + 1(x), a = 0 and b = 1 if fk(x) = 0; otherwise, choose integers a and b such that fk + 1(x)/fk(x) = b/a and define y = fk(x)/a = fk + 1(x)/b. In each case, y cannot be 0, because otherwise it would follow from claim 1 that each fk + n(x) (n ∈ N) would be 0, which would contradict claim 2. Now, take a natural number c such that all three numbers bc/k, ck/x2 and c/x2 are integers and consider the sequence

Then

On the other hand, it follows from claim 1 that

which is a linear combination of gn + 1 and gn with integer coefficients. Therefore, each gn is an integer multiple of y. Besides, it follows from claim 2 that each gn is greater than 0 (and therefore that gn ≥ |y|) if n is large enough and that the sequence of all gn converges to 0. But a sequence of numbers greater than or equal to |y| cannot converge to 0.

Since f1/2(/4) = cos(/2) = 0, it follows from claim 3 that 2/16 is irrational and therefore that  is irrational.

On the other hand, since

another consequence of Claim 3 is that, if x ∈ Q \ {0}, then tan x is irrational.

Laczkovich's proof is really about the hypergeometric function. In fact, fk(x) = 0F1(k; −x2) and Gauss found a continued fraction expansion of the hypergeometric function using its functional equation. This allowed Laczkovich to find a new and simpler proof of the fact that the tangent function has the continued fraction expansion that Lambert had discovered.

Laczkovich's result can also be expressed in Bessel functions of the first kind Jν(x). In fact, Γ(k)Jk − 1(2x) = xk − 1fk(x). So Laczkovich's result is equivalent to: If x ≠ 0 and if x2 is rational, then

See also 

 Proof that e is irrational
 Proof that  is transcendental

References 

Pi
Article proofs
Irrational numbers